is a 1957 Japanese drama film directed by Shirō Toyoda, based on the novel of the same name by Yasunari Kawabata. The film was entered into the 1958 Cannes Film Festival.

Cast
 Ryō Ikebe as Shimamura
 Keiko Kishi as Komako
 Kaoru Yachigusa as Yoko
 Daisuke Katō
 Akira Kubo
 Hisaya Morishige as Yukio
 Chieko Naniwa as Head maid
 Haruo Tanaka as Porter

Awards
Screenwriter Toshio Yasumi received the Kinema Junpo Award for Best Screenplay for Snow Country and Chieko-shō.

References

External links
 

Japanese black-and-white films
1957 films
1957 drama films
Films based on works by Yasunari Kawabata
Films directed by Shirō Toyoda
1950s Japanese films